Bannerghatta National Park is a national park in India, located near Bangalore, Karnataka. It was founded in 1970 and declared as a national park in 1974. In 2002, a small portion of the park became a zoological garden, the Bannerghatta Biological Park.

There are ancient temples in the park for worship and it is a destination for trekking and hiking. Within the national park area are six rural villages enclosed within three large enclosures for sheep and cattle farming. This park offers a wide range of diverse wildlife to the exploradoras. Coming from the finest of Bengaluru, Karnataka, this park offers a guided bus tour all along the 6 km safari roads, which is specially made for safarists and foreign tourist gatherers.

Geography 
The 65,127.5 acre (260.51 km2) national park is located about 22 km south of Bangalore in the hills of the Anekal range with an elevation of 1245 - 1634m. The park has a hilly terrain of granite sheets under moist deciduous forest valleys and scrubland on higher areas. Sixteen villages border the park. Most of the national park consists of artificial forest, and some animals have been introduced. The park is part of a wildlife corridor for elephants which connects the BR Hills and the Sathyamangalam forest. The park is contiguous with Talli reserve forest in the southeast and Bilikal forest in the south.

Water sources 
The park's rainfall is 700 mm per year. The Suvarnamukhi stream runs through the national park. On 15 May 2014, four bore wells were opened to provide water in dry times.

Flora
Flora in the park include:

 Narcissus latifolia
 Schleichera oleosa
 Terminalia tomentosa
 Sandalwood
 Neem
 T. arjuna
 Grewia tilaefolia
 Santalum album
 Tamarind
 Bamboo
 Eucalyptus
 Bauhinia purpurea
 Samanea saman
 Peltphorum pterocarpum

 Indian elephants 
 gaur 
 Indian leopard
 jackal
 fox
 sloth bear
 Indian gazelle
 spotted deer
 barking deer
 common langur
 bonnet macaque
 porcupine
 hare
 wild boar
 pangolin
 Royal Bengal tiger
 slender loris
 monitor lizard
 cobras
 python
 Russell's viper
 krait
 peacock
crocodile
Asiatic lion
Flamingo
Nilgai
Blackbuck
Pelican
Indian wolf
Striped hyena
Himalayan black bear
Fauna from other countries
Giraffe
 Hamadryas baboon

One hundred and one species of birds have been recorded in the park. The fauna pose some risk to humans. In August 2012, a man was trampled to death by an elephant. Occasionally, animals leave the reserve, coming into contact with humans. For example, elephants have been sighted on the Bantamweight-Anekal road which passes close to the park. In 2007, a leopard and her cubs entered a local school.

Illegal mining around Bannerghatta national park 
The park is threatened by multiple granite quarries operating around the national park. These quarries are located alarmingly close to critical elephant corridors inside the national park such as Kardikal - Madeswara corridor. While there is ban on mining and granite quarrying around the national park within a radius of One km from the boundary demarcated as "Safe Zone", quarries operate unabatedly. Vehicular movement is also uncontrolled. Tremors from the explosives used in the quarry operations are felt across a radius of at least five km adversely affecting elephants and other wild animals.

Gallery

See also 
 Bangalore Division
 Bayalu Seeme
 Tyavarekoppa Lion and Tiger Safari
 Wildlife of India

References

External links 

 , The Hindu
 Lions’ club grows at Bannerghatta park
 Butterfly Park, The Hindu
 Rangers in India capture tiger that killed girl, 5. Orlando Sentinel, 15 September 1992.
 Travel Guide to Bannerghatta National Park, Onebangalore.com.
 Bannerghatta National Park, Karnataka Tourism Official Website.

National parks in Karnataka
Protected areas established in 1974
Important Bird Areas of India
South Deccan Plateau dry deciduous forests
1974 establishments in Karnataka
Tourist attractions in Bangalore
Elephant reserves of India